Ivan Stepanovich Utrobin (March 10, 1934 – June 25, 2020) was a Russian cross-country skier who competed during the early 1960s for the Soviet Union, training at VSS Trud in Moscow Oblast. He earned a bronze medal in the 4 × 10 km relay at 1964 Winter Olympics in Innsbruck. He also won a bronze medal in the 4 × 10 km relay at the 1962 FIS Nordic World Ski Championships.

External links
Sports Illustrated profile
Biography 
World Championship results 
Ivan Utrobin's obituary

1934 births
2020 deaths
Olympic cross-country skiers of the Soviet Union
Olympic bronze medalists for the Soviet Union
Soviet male cross-country skiers
Cross-country skiers at the 1964 Winter Olympics
Olympic medalists in cross-country skiing
FIS Nordic World Ski Championships medalists in cross-country skiing
Medalists at the 1964 Winter Olympics